The Ford Motor Company Edgewater Assembly Plant was located in Edgewater, Bergen County, New Jersey, United States. The factory began operations in 1930 and was closed in 1955, having been replaced by the Mahwah Assembly plant. The building was built in 1929 and added to the National Register of Historic Places on September 15, 1983, located at 309 River Road. The building was torn down in 2006 and replaced with a residential development.

See also

Alcoa Edgewater Works
Edgewater Tunnel
National Register of Historic Places listings in Bergen County, New Jersey
List of Ford factories

References

External links

Ford Edgewater Assembly

Ford factories
Edgewater, New Jersey
Former motor vehicle assembly plants
Motor vehicle assembly plants in New Jersey
Buildings and structures in Bergen County, New Jersey
Demolished buildings and structures in New Jersey
Industrial buildings completed in 1929
Motor vehicle manufacturing plants on the National Register of Historic Places
National Register of Historic Places in Bergen County, New Jersey
New Jersey Register of Historic Places
Transportation buildings and structures on the National Register of Historic Places in New Jersey
Historic American Engineering Record in New Jersey
Buildings and structures demolished in 2006
1929 establishments in New Jersey
2006 disestablishments in New Jersey